Jeff Lee may refer to:

 Jeff Lee (American football) (born 1955), former American football player
 Jeff Lee (footballer) (born 1945), former American football player
 Jeff Lee (swimmer) (born 1981), former swimmer
 Jeff Lee (video game artist) (born 1952), video game artist